The Inner Mongolia incident, or the Inner Mongolia People's Revolutionary Party purge incident, was a massive political purge which occurred during the Cultural Revolution in Inner Mongolia. The purge was supported by the Central Committee of the Chinese Communist Party and was led by Teng Haiqing, a lieutenant general (zhong jiang) of the People's Liberation Army. It took place from 1967 to 1969 during which over a million people were categorized as members of the already-dissolved Inner Mongolian People's Revolutionary Party (PRP), while lynching and direct massacre resulted in the deaths of tens of thousands, most of whom were Mongols.

According to the official complaint from the Supreme People's Procuratorate in 1980 after the Cultural Revolution, during the purge, 346,000 people were arrested, 16,222 people were persecuted to death or killed directly, and over 81,000 were permanently injured and disabled. Other estimates have put a death toll between 20,000 and 100,000, while hundreds of thousands were arrested and persecuted, and over a million people were affected.

After the Cultural Revolution, the purge was regarded as a "mistake" and its victims were rehabilitated by the Chinese Communist Party (CCP) during the "Boluan Fanzheng" period, but the commander of the purge, Teng Haiqing, received no trial or legal punishment at all because the Central Committee of CCP thought he had made achievements during the wars in the past. On the other hand, some of Teng's affiliates received various terms of imprisonment, with a main Mongol affiliate sentenced to 15 years in prison.

Historical background 

On 16 May 1966, the Cultural Revolution was officially launched in mainland China by Mao Zedong with the help of Cultural Revolution Group. From 7 June to 20 July 1966, Ulanhu, then Chairman of China's Inner Mongolia Autonomous Region, was accused of being an "anti-Party activist" and was persecuted. At the time, Ulanhu was also criticized by top leaders such as Liu Shaoqi and Deng Xiaoping, whom themselves were soon to be persecuted as well in the Cultural Revolution. On 16 August 1966, Ulanhu was dismissed from his official positions and was placed under house arrest in Beijing. Some of his close affiliates such as Ji Yatai were also persecuted.

In May 1967, Teng Haiqing was appointed the top leader of the Inner Mongolia Military Region. On 27 July 1967, the northern branch of the Central Committee of the Chinese Communist Party announced that Ulanhu had conducted five crimes, including anti-Maoism, anti-socialism, separatism, and so on. Supported by Marshal Lin Biao, Jiang Qing (Mao's wife) and Kang Sheng (head of the internal intelligence agency of the Central Social Affairs Department), Teng began to initiate a massive purge which was intended to "dig out" the "poison of Ulanhu" in the Inner Mongolia region.

During the purge, the already-dissolved Inner Mongolian People's Revolutionary Party (PRP) was claimed to have re-established itself and have grown into power since 1960. And, Ulanhu was accused of being the leader of this Party. At least hundreds of thousands of people in Inner Mongolia were "categorized" as members of the PRP, whom were regarded as separatists and were subsequently persecuted. During the purge, the Mongolian language was banned from publications and Mongols were accused of being  “the sons and heirs of Genghis Khan”.

Lynching and massacre

Methods of torturing and killing 
The methods used in lynching and killing during the purge included branding with hot irons, feeding furnace wastes, removing livers, hanging, cutting tongues and noses, piercing nails, piercing vaginas, pouring hot saline water into wounds, and more.

Death toll 
According to the official complaint from the Supreme People's Procuratorate in 1980 after the Cultural Revolution, during the purge, 346,000 people were arrested (75 percent were Mongols), over 16,000 were persecuted to death, and over 81,000 were permanently injured and disabled.

Other estimates include:

 According to scholar Ba He: close to 100 thousand people were killed, 700–800 thousand were arrested and persecuted, and over a million were affected.
According to Chinese historian Song Yongyi of the California State University, Los Angeles: an unofficial source points out that the death toll was at least 40,000; 140,000 reached the point of permanent deformity, and nearly 700,000 were persecuted.
 According to historian Lhamjab A. Borjigin, who was arrested and prosecuted by the Chinese government in 2019 for his research: at least 27,900 were killed and 346,000 were imprisoned and tortured.

Notable figures killed 

 Ji Yatai, 1st Ambassador of the People's Republic of China to Mongolia (1950–1953) and vice-chairman of Inner Mongolia Autonomous Region.
Ha Fenge, Vice-chairman of Inner Mongolia Autonomous Region. 
 Darijaya, Vice-chairman of the Government of Inner Mongolia.

Rehabilitation 
After the Cultural Revolution, China's new paramount leader Deng Xiaoping came to power in December 1978 and, together with Hu Yaobang and others, launched a large-scale campaign to rehabilitate victims in the so-called "unjust, false, and incorrect cases (冤假错案)" made during the Cultural Revolution.

The Inner Mongolia incident was regarded as a "mistake" and its victims were rehabilitated by the Chinese Communist Party (CCP) in 1979 during the "Boluan Fanzheng" period, blaming the entire purge on “the Gang of Four and the Lin Biao Clique”. Trials for the Gang of Four began in 1980.

In the 1980s, there were calls for trial of Teng Haiqing, the commander of the purge in Inner Mongolia, but the Central Committee of CCP thought Teng had made achievement during the past wars and therefore he would not be further punished for leading the purge. On the other hand, some of Teng's affiliates received various terms of imprisonment, with a main Mongol affiliate, Wulan Bagan, sentenced to 15 years in prison.

See also 

 Mass killings under communist regimes
 List of massacres in China
 Cultural Revolution
Boluan Fanzheng
Cleansing the Class Ranks

References

Further reading 

 Yang Haiying. The Truth about the Mongolian Genocide during the Chinese Cultural Revolution. Asian Studies, Special Issue 6, Shizuoka University. March 2017.
 Kerry Brown. The Purge of the Inner Mongolian People's Party in the Chinese Cultural Revolution, 1967–69. Global Oriental Ltd., May 2004.
Paul Hyer and William Heaton. The Cultural Revolution in Inner Mongolia. The China Quarterly, No. 36 (Oct. – Dec. 1968), pp. 114–128

Cultural Revolution
Political and cultural purges
Massacres in China
Man-made disasters in China
History of Inner Mongolia
Massacres committed by the People's Republic of China
Genocidal massacres
Genocides in Asia
Persecution of Mongols